Santiago Fernández Idiart (born 17 January 1991 in Uruguay) is a Uruguayan footballer who plays for Uruguayan club CA Artigas.

References

Uruguayan footballers
Living people
Association football goalkeepers
1991 births
Boston River players
Deportivo Maldonado players
CF Sant Rafel players
Atenas de San Carlos players
Rampla Juniors players